Yang Jian (born 4 October 1988, in Shenyang) is a Chinese footballer who currently plays for China League One side Shenyang Urban as a defensive midfielder.

Club career
Yang started his professional career in 2006 when he was promoted to Chinese Super League side Shenzhen Kingway first team squad. On 15 September 2007, he made his senior debut in a 5–0 away defeat against Shandong Luneng Taishan. Yang played 5 matches for Shenzhen in the 2007 season. However, he lost his position in 2008 and was put on the transfer list at the end of 2008 season.

Yang returned to play professional football in 2012 when he joined China League Two club Shenzhen Fengpeng which was newly founded by former Shenzhen F.C. players and staffs. He scored 7 goals in 28 appearances in the 2012 season while Shenzhen Fengpeng was knocked out in the semi-finals of play-offs by Hubei China-Kyle and failed to promote to second tier.

Yang transferred to China League One club Guangdong Sunray Cave with Shenzhen Fengpeng's manager Zhang Jun in January 2013. On 16 March, he made his debut for Guangdong Sunray Cave in the first round of the league which Guangdong beat Chengdu Blades 2–1 at home. He scored his first goal for Guangdong on 28 April, in a 1–0 away victory against Beijing Baxy.

In January 2016, Yang transferred to his hometown club Shenyang City in the China League Two. He would go on to win the 2019 China League Two division with the club.

International career
Yang was part of the China national under-17 football team to win the 2004 AFC U-17 Championship. He also played for China U-17s in the 2005 FIFA U-17 World Championship.

Career statistics
Statistics accurate as of match played 31 December 2020.

Honours

Club
Shenyang Urban
 China League Two: 2019

International
China under-17 national football team
 AFC U-17 Championship: 2004

References

External links

1988 births
Living people
Chinese footballers
Footballers from Shenyang
Shenzhen F.C. players
Guangdong Sunray Cave players
Guizhou F.C. players
Liaoning Shenyang Urban F.C. players
Chinese Super League players
China League One players
China League Two players
Association football midfielders